Aspaneus was a town of the ancient Troad, within the territory of Antandrus.

Its site is located near Avcılar, Asiatic Turkey.

References

Populated places in ancient Troad
Former populated places in Turkey